Steromphala spratti is a species of sea snail, a marine gastropod mollusk in the family Trochidae, the top snails.

Description
The size of the shell varies between 5 mm and 8 mm. The somewhat thick, narrowly perforate shell has a conoid shape. It is whitish, radiately tlammulate with deep brown subquadrate maculations. The shell is very finely obliquely striate, and  concentrically lirate. Each whorl is encircled by two more prominent, remote sulci. The shell contains 6 convex whorls, separated by deep sutures, and inflated above. The body whorl is subangulate, convex beneath, and contains numerous unequal concentric lirae. The aperture is rhomboidal. The slightly convex columella is sinuous in the middle.

Distribution
This species occurs in the Aegean Sea.

References

 Nordsieck, F. (1982) Die Europäischen Meeres-Gehäuseschnecken (Prosobranchia). Vom Eismeer bis Kapverden, Mittelmeer und Schwarzes Meer. 2., Völlig Neubearbeitete und Erweiterte Auflage. Gustav Fischer Verlag, Stuttgart, xii + 539 pp.

External links
 
 Forbes E. (1844). Report on the Mollusca and Radiata of the Aegean sea, and on their distribution, considered as bearing on geology. Reports of the British Association for the Advancement of Science for 1843. 130-193
 Philippi, R. A. (1846-1855). Die Kreiselschnecken oder Trochoideen (Gattungen Turbo, Trochus, Solarium, Rotella, Delphinula, Phasianella). In Abbildungen nach der Natur mit Beschreibungen. In: Küster, H. C.; Ed. Systematisches Conchylien Cabinet von Martini und Chemnitz. Zweiten Bandes, dritte Abtheilung. 2(3): 1-372, pl. 1-49. Nürnberg: Bauer & Raspe
 Philippi, R. A. (1846). Diagnoses testaceorum quorundam novorum. Zeitschrift für Malakozoologie. 3: 97-106
 Forbes E. (1844). Report on the Mollusca and Radiata of the Aegean sea, and on their distribution, considered as bearing on geology. Reports of the British Association for the Advancement of Science for 1843. 130-193
 Affenzeller S., Haar N. & Steiner G. (2017). Revision of the genus complex Gibbula: an integrative approach to delineating the Eastern Mediterranean genera Gibbula Risso, 1826, Steromphala Gray, 1847, and Phorcus Risso, 1826 using DNA-barcoding and geometric morphometrics (Vetigastropoda, Trochoidea). Organisms Diversity & Evolution. 17(4): 789-812

spratti
Gastropods described in 1844